The Cypress Hills station is a skip-stop station on the BMT Jamaica Line of the New York City Subway, located on Jamaica Avenue in the Cypress Hills neighborhood of northeastern Brooklyn. It is served by the J train at all times. The Z train skips this station when it operates.

History
This station was opened on May 30, 1893 as part of the Brooklyn Elevated Railroad's four stop extension of the Lexington Avenue Line to Cypress Hills. The original Cypress Hills station had two tracks and one island platform and was located along Crescent Street, reaching the cemetery. This station was the terminal for both the Jamaica Line and the BMT Lexington Avenue Line when it opened. It formerly had an island platform and stub-end located directly along Crescent Street just south of Jamaica Avenue that can still be seen approaching the cemetery east of the station.

The rebuilt station was constructed under the Dual Contracts and was opened on May 28, 1917.  The rebuilt station has two tracks and two side platforms. The removal of the island platform resulted in a space between the tracks. This space would allow for an express third track, but one was never built.

In October 1950, Lexington Avenue Line trains ceased to serve this station.

In February 2023, the Metropolitan Transportation Authority announced that this station would temporarily close for renovations as part of a station renewal contract at four stations on the Jamaica Line. The Queens-bound platforms at Cypress Hills and 85th Street-Forest Parkway will close in late winter of 2024. The closure will shift to the Manhattan-bound platforms at these stations in the summer of 2024. Work includes platform renewals, replacement of stairs, canopies, and windscreens, installation of artwork, and minimizing the gaps between the train and the platform edge. The work will be performed by Gramercy PJS Joint-Venture.

Station layout

This is the northernmost station in Brooklyn on the BMT Jamaica Line, since the next stop, is in Queens. Both platforms have beige windscreens and green canopies with brown roofs that run along the entire length. For this reason, a train must take more time to transverse this section than other sections of the line.

The 1990 artwork here is called Five Points of Observation, by Kathleen McCarthy. It affords a view of the street from the platforms and resembles a face when seen from the street. This artwork is also located in four other stations on the Jamaica Line.

Exits

The station's main entrance is at the south end. A single staircase from each platform leads to an elevated station house beneath the tracks. Inside are three turnstiles and a token booth. Outside of fare control, two street stairs lead to the corners of Hemlock and Crescent Streets.

On the north end of each platform, a single staircase leads to a landing outside of a now closed station house. On the Queens-bound platform, a single exit-only turnstile provides exit from the system and a street stair perpendicular to the line leads to Autumn Avenue, which ends at Jamaica Avenue. The exit on the Manhattan-bound platform was closed, and the street stair was removed.

References

External links 

 
 Station Reporter — J Train
 The Subway Nut — Cypress Hills Pictures 
 MTA's Arts For Transit — Cypress Hills (BMT Jamaica Line)
 Crescent Street and Hemlock Street entrance from Google Maps Street View
 Autumn Avenue entrance from Google Maps Street View
 Platforms from Google Maps Street View

BMT Jamaica Line stations
1893 establishments in New York (state)
Cypress Hills, Brooklyn
New York City Subway stations in Brooklyn
Railway stations in the United States opened in 1893